Rolnikas is a Lithuanian-language surname derived from the Polish surname Rolnik. Notable people with the surname include:

Macha Rolnikas (1927–2016), Jewish Lithuanian writer and Holocaust survivor

Lithuanian-language surnames
Surnames of Polish origin